Saralinda Jane "Sally" Brock (née Hartley; born 1953) is an English bridge player. She has been part of the winning team in five Women's European Championships, two Venice Cups and two World Team Olympiads. In November 2017, she received the Diamond Award from the English Bridge Union (EBU) in recognition of her outstanding contribution to England's international teams.

Life
Brock was educated at Godolphin School and Nottingham University, where she met her first husband Tony Sowter. In 1981 she married Mark Horton. In 1993 she married Raymond Brock, who died in 2008. She has three children: Ben, Briony and Toby.

Bridge career
In 1976, she played her first Lady Milne Championship with Sally Eggett, heavily pregnant with her first child Benjamin. In 1979, she played her first European Championship with Sandra Landy, which they won. In 1980, they won a Bronze at the European Championships. In 1981, they won the European Championship again as well as the Venice Cup. In 1987 she began playing bridge with Steve Lodge.

Brock resumed her bridge career in 2000, initially in the mixed teams in Masstricht partnering Jason Hackett. She then formed a partnership with Margaret Courtney where they won the European Championship in 2001 in Tenerife. In 2004, she played with Kitty Teltscher in the Olympiad in Istanbul, where they won a bronze medal.

In 2008, she formed a partnership with Nicola Smith, and that year they won the gold medal at the World Mind Sports Games in Beijing. They were a regular partnership in the England women's team contending for the Venice Cup in 2011 (4th), 2013 (2nd) and 2015 (3rd). In that period they also competed in four European Championships including 2012 (gold), 2014 (silver) and 2016 (gold). They also were part of the World Teams winners in Lille in 2012, and Sanya in 2014.

In 2015 Brock was appointed as Squad Leader for England's Under 25 Women's Squad.

In 2017, Brock began a partnership with Fiona Brown, and later that same year they were part of the England team that came second in the Venice Cup.

She is the bridge correspondent of the Sunday Times.

Bridge accomplishments

National events

 Gold Cup 1984, 1989, 1990
 Crockfords 1985, 1987, 1990, 2004
 National Teams Congress 1990
 Hubert Phillips 2000, 2001, 2002, 2004, 2014, 2016, 2019
 Tollemache 2013, 2014

European Championships

 Gold Switzerland, 1979 - playing with Sandra Landy
 Gold UK, 1981 - playing with Sandra Landy
 Bronze Germany, 1983 - playing with Sandra Landy
 Silver Italy, 1985 - playing with Sandra Landy
 Bronze UK, 1987 - playing with Sandra Landy
 Gold Tenerife, 2001 - playing with Margaret James
 Gold Ireland, 2012 - playing with Nicola Smith
 Silver Croatia, 2014 - playing with Nicola Smith
 Gold Hungary, 2016 - playing with Nicola Smith

World Championships

Olympiad

 Bronze Netherlands, 1980 - playing with Sandra Landy
 Bronze France, 1982 - playing with Sandra Landy
 Silver USA, 1984 - playing with Sandra Landy
 Bronze USA, 1986 - playing with Sandra Landy
 Bronze Turkey, 2004 - playing with Kitty Teltscher
 Gold China, 2008 - playing with Nicola Smith
 Gold China, 2008 - playing with Nicola Smith

Venice Cup

Gold USA, 1981 - playing with Sandra Landy
Gold Brazil, 1985 - playing with Sandra Landy
Silver India, 2015 - playing with Nicola Smith
Silver France, 2017 - playing with Fiona Brown

McConnell Cup

Gold China, 2014 - playing with Nicola Smith
Gold USA, 2018- playing with Fiona Brown
Silver USA, 2018 - mixed teams playing with Chris Wilenken

References

External links
 
 
 Sally Brock at the English Bridge Union

1953 births
Living people
English contract bridge players
Venice Cup players
Alumni of the University of Nottingham